Paglu 2  is a 2012 Indian Bengali romantic action comedy film directed by Sujit Mondal starring Dev and Koel Mallick in lead roles. This is sequel to Paglu series but storywise not a sequel of Paglu. A major portion of this movie has been shot in Dubai. This film is a remake of 2011 Telugu film Kandireega, directed by Santosh Srinivas and starring Ram and Hansika Motwani and also another popular remake was later done on Kandireega by 2014 Hindi film Main Tera Hero starring Varun Dhawan, Ileana D'Cruz, Nargis Fakhri.It was second Highest Grossing movie in 2012.

Plot
 
Dev is a high school dropout from and a worthless village lad. He is hell bent on getting married. But the girl he wants to marry rejects him stating that he doesn't have college education. Dev, who is clever and street-smart decides to go to Kolkata for further education. While travelling in the train, he bashes up a bunch of rowdies teasing college girls. At the college in Kolkata, he meets Riya and falls in love with her. A city gangster, Rudra, is in love with her and blackmails her to marry him. He beats anyone moving closely with Riya. Meanwhile, henchmen of the dreaded chieftain Dubai Keshto, from Dubai, are looking for Dev in the city.

Cast
 Dev as Dev (Paglu)
 Koel Mallick as Riya
 Tota Roy Chowdhury as Rudra
 Rajatava Dutta as Krishno Ghoshal aka Dubai Keshto, the most wanted person in CBI 
 Rimjhim Mitra as Kabita Ghoshal, Dubai Keshto's daughter
 Biswajit Chakraborty as Dev's father
 Biswanath Basu as Dev's friend
 Sayak Chakraborty as Dev's friend
 Kharaj Mukherjee as Voice-over of Lord Shiva
 Pradip Dhar
 Bharat Kaul as Badshah Khan, Dubai Keshto's biggest enemy
 Mousumi Saha as Dev's mother
 Kunal Padhi as Riya's father

Soundtrack 

The soundtrack of the film was scored by Jeet Gannguli.

Awards
Anandalok Award for Best Actor (Male) - Nominated
Best Bengali film nominations for Anandalok Puraskar 2012

References

External links
 

2012 films
Bengali remakes of Telugu films
2012 romantic comedy films
Films scored by Jeet Ganguly
Indian romantic comedy films
Bengali-language Indian films
2010s Bengali-language films
Films shot in Dubai